The  is an automated guideway transit (AGT) system between Nippori Station in Arakawa and Minumadai-shinsuikōen Station in Adachi, Tokyo, Japan. The line opened on 30 March 2008. It is operated by the Tokyo Metropolitan Bureau of Transportation (Toei).

Overview
A journey from end to end takes 20 minutes, compared to as long as 60 minutes by bus during rush hour.

In fiscal 2008, an average of 48,943 people used the line each day. This compares to a 2007 forecast of 51,000 passengers per day. by 2018, ridership has grown to 90,737 passengers per day. In 2018, the Nippori Toneri Liner reaches 189% capacity on the AM peak hour between Nishi Nippori and Akado Shogakkomae stations. This crowding rivals other crowded train lines in Tokyo, slotting in between the Tokaido line in Tokyo and the Keihin-Tohoku line but at the time, the line was only operating with headways every 3-4 minutes during the AM rush.

Station list
All stations are located in Tokyo.

Rolling stock
As of April 2020, services on the line are operated using:
 300 series (5-car sets × 16, since 30 March 2008)
 330 series (5-car sets × 3, since 10 October 2015)
 320 series (5-car set × 1, since 10 May 2017)

From its opening, the line has used a fleet of 300 series trainsets with stainless steel bodies. From 10 October 2015, one new 330 series trainset was introduced on the line. This five-car set was built by Mitsubishi Heavy Industries, and has an aluminium body. A new 320 series trainset (set 21) entered service on the line on 10 May 2017. Like the 330 series, this set has two pairs of sliding doors on the side of each car, and all seating is longitudinal bench seating.

History
The western part of Adachi is poorly served by public transport and planning of the line started in 1985, with the initial intention of constructing a full-fledged subway. However, this was scrapped due to the high cost and projected low ridership, and a more cost-efficient AGT system was selected instead. Construction of the line started in 1997, and service commenced on 30 March 2008. The main contractor was the Tokyo Metropolitan Subway Construction Company, which also built the Toei Oedo Line.

Incidents
A 5.9 magnitude earthquake partly derailed three cars of a train of the Nippori-Toneri Liner at 10:41 pm on Thursday, 7 October 2021. Three passengers were injured, but there were no fatalities. Repair works were expected to last several days.

References

Notes 

a. Crowding levels defined by the Ministry of Land, Infrastructure, Transport and Tourism:

100% — Commuters have enough personal space and are able to take a seat or stand while holding onto the straps or hand rails.
150% — Commuters have enough personal space to read a newspaper.
180% — Commuters must fold newspapers to read.
200% — Commuters are pressed against each other in each compartment but can still read small magazines.
250% — Commuters are pressed against each other, unable to move.

External links

 Tokyo Metropolitan Bureau of Transportation: Nippori-Toneri Line 
 Tokyo Bureau of Construction: Nippori-Toneri Line  

 Tokyo Sakura Tram and Nippori-Toneri Liner station numbering 

 
People mover systems in Japan
Railway lines opened in 2008
2008 establishments in Japan